Hindsiclava appelii, common name the chocolate turrid, is a species of sea snail, a marine gastropod mollusk in the family Pseudomelatomidae, the turrids and allies.

Description
The length of the shell varies between 18 mm and 28 mm.

The shell is narrower than Crassispira callosa (Kiener, 1840), with more numerous ribs and a longer siphonal canal. Its color is light ochraceous. The shell is indistinctly white-banded.

Distribution
This species occurs in the Atlantic Ocean off Brazil

References

 Weinkauff, H. C. (1875–1876): Die Familie Pleurotomidae. Erste Abtheilung. — In: Küster, H. C., Kobelt, W. & Weinkauff, H. C. (Eds.): Systematisches Conchylien-Cabinet von Martini und Chemnitz, 4 (3) (238): 1–24, pls

External links
 
 

appelii
Gastropods described in 1876